Military Park may refer to:

 Military Park (Indianapolis), a U.S. Historic district in Indianapolis, Indiana
 Military Park (Newark), a U.S. Historic district in Newark, New Jersey
 Military Park (NLR station), an underground station of the Newark Light Rail of the Newark Light Rail
 National Military Park, sites preserved by the United States federal government because of their national importance
 Military Park (Taiwan), a military park in Xinyi District, Keelung City, Taiwan

See also